
Gmina Leszno is a rural gmina (administrative district) in Warsaw West County, Masovian Voivodeship, in east-central Poland.

Villages
Gmina Leszno contains the villages and settlements of Czarnów, Czarnów-Towarzystwo, Feliksów, Gawartowa Wola, Grabina, Grądki, Grądy, Julinek, Kępiaste, Korfowe, Ławy, Leszno, Łubiec, Marianów, Plewniak, Podrochale, Powązki, Roztoka, Stelmachowo, Szadkówek, Szymanówek, Trzciniec, Walentów, Wąsy-Kolonia, Wąsy-Wieś, Wiktorów, Wilków, Wilkowa Wieś, Wólka, Wyględy, Zaborów and Zaborówek.

Neighbouring gminas
Gmina Leszno is bordered by the gminas of Błonie, Czosnów, Izabelin, Kampinos, Leoncin, Ożarów Mazowiecki, Stare Babice and Teresin.

References

Polish official population figures 2006

Leszno
Warsaw West County